Diona is a village and seat of the commune of Korarou in the Cercle of Douentza in the Mopti Region of southern-central Mali.

References

Populated places in Mopti Region